The 1220s BC is a decade which lasted from 1229 BC to 1220 BC.

Events and trends
 1221 BC—Pharaoh Merneptah defeats a Libyan invasion.

References